The Mardin mine is a large mine in Mardin Province, in the south-east of Turkey, 743 km south-east of the capital, Ankara. Mardin represents one of the largest phosphates reserves in Turkey having estimated reserves of 200 million tonnes of ore grading 11% P2O5.

References

External links 
 Official site

Phosphate mines in Turkey
Buildings and structures in Mardin Province